was a private university in Fukuoka, Fukuoka, Japan, established in 1967. It closed in 2011.

External links
 Official website 

Educational institutions established in 1967
Universities and colleges in Fukuoka Prefecture
Defunct private universities and colleges in Japan